Surviving Jeffrey Epstein is an American documentary television miniseries about convicted sex offender Jeffrey Epstein, directed by Anne Sundberg and Ricki Stern. It consists of 4-episodes and premiered on August 9, 2020, on Lifetime.

Plot
The documentary series follows convicted sex offender Jeffrey Epstein who used his power and finances to shield his predatory behavior. Eight survivors share their stories in the documentary. Courtney Wild, Rachel Kay Benavides, and Virginia Roberts Giuffre appear in the series, along with new victims who chose to come forward for the first time.  The series continued filming close to the release date in order to include the FBI arrest of British socialite and alleged Epstein co-conspirator Ghislaine Maxwell on July 2, 2020.

Episodes

Production
In July 2019, it was announced Anne Sundberg and Ricki Stern would direct the documentary, with Robert Friedman set to produce the series under his Bungalow Media + Entertainment banner, to premiere on Lifetime. In January 2020, Lifetime greenlit the series.

Broadcast
In the United States, the series premiered on August 9, 2020, with back-to-back episodes before concluding on August 10 on Lifetime. In the United Kingdom, the series premiered on August 25, 2020, with back-to-back episodes before concluding on August 26, on Crime & Investigation.

Reception

Critical response
On Metacritic, the series has a weighted average score of 76 out of 100, based on 4 critics, indicating "generally favorable reviews".

Impact
The National Sexual Assault Hotline in the United States, operated by the Rape, Abuse & Incest National Network (RAINN), experienced a 34% increase in calls during the airing of the documentary.

See also 
 Jeffrey Epstein: Filthy Rich
 Surviving R. Kelly

References

External links
 

2020 American television series debuts
2020 American television series endings
2020s American documentary television series
2020s American television miniseries
Lifetime (TV network) original programming
Jeffrey Epstein
Films about child sexual abuse